The Ohio District is one of the 35 districts of the Lutheran Church–Missouri Synod (LCMS), and covers the states of Ohio and West Virginia, as well as north eastern Kentucky (the remainder of Kentucky is divided between the Indiana District and the Mid-South District). In addition, sixteen Ohio congregations are in the non-geographic English District, and eleven are in the SELC District.  The Ohio District comprises 167 congregations and missions, subdivided into 16 circuits, as well as 39 preschools, 19 elementary schools, and 2 high schools. Baptized membership in Ohio District congregations is approximately 54,576.

The Ohio District was formed in 1963 when the Central District was divided, also creating the Indiana District. District offices are located in Olmsted Falls, Ohio, just west of Cleveland. Delegates from each congregation meet in convention every three years to elect the district president, vice presidents, circuit counselors, a board of directors, and other officers. Rev. Dr. Kevin Wilson became the district president in September 2018.

Presidents
Rev. Ottomar Krueger, 1963–1966
Rev. Paul G. Single, 1966–1969
Rev. Edgar M. Luecke, 1969–1970
Rev. Arthur H. Ziegler, 1970–1982
Rev. Paul A. Weber, 1982–1988
Rev. David D. Buegler, 1988–1996
Rev. Ronald L. Bergen, 1996–2006
Rev. Terry L. Cripe, 2006–2018
Rev. Dr. Kevin Wilson, 2018–present

References

External links
Ohio District web site
LCMS: Ohio District
LCMS Congregation Directory

Lutheran Church–Missouri Synod districts
Lutheranism in Kentucky
Lutheranism in Ohio
Lutheranism in West Virginia
Christian organizations established in 1963